Desmond Martin Linton is an English former professional footballer. He was born on 5 September 1971 in Birmingham, United Kingdom.

Career

Linton began his career with Leicester City, where he made eleven league appearances before moving along with teammate Scott Oakes to Luton Town. After six years with Luton, he moved on to Peterborough United, where he spent two years before a short loan spell at Swindon Town. He finished his career with Cambridge City.

References

External links

1971 births
Living people
English footballers
Leicester City F.C. players
Luton Town F.C. players
Peterborough United F.C. players
Swindon Town F.C. players
Cambridge City F.C. players
English Football League players
Footballers from Birmingham, West Midlands
Association football defenders